Apna Time Bhi Aayega was an Indian Hindi-language television drama that aired on Zee TV and also digitally available on ZEE5. The show stars Fahman Khan, Megha Ray and Vivana Singh in the lead roles. The show is loosely based on the 2017 Tamil drama series Sembaruthi. 

The show revolves around the life of Rani, an intelligent, ambitious village girl who aspires to become an engineer but is forced to work as a servant for the royal Rajawat family. Rajeshwari Singh Rajawat "Rani Sa" is the family's arrogant matriarch. Due to circumstances, Rani is forced to marry Veer, Rani Sa's son. Rani Sa initially does not accept her, but eventually does. 

Megha Ray replaced Anushka Sen, Vivana Singh replaced Tannaz Irani in 2021.

The series premiered on 20 October 2020 and was produced by Ved Raj, under the company Shoonya Square Productions. The show's final episode was telecast on 16 October 2021.

Plot
Rani is an ambitious village girl who aspires to become an engineer and comes to Jaipur to fulfill her dream. Her father, Ramadheer works for a royal family in Jaipur, the Rajawat family. He is arrested on the charge of running a car over four people while drunk. Rajeshwari Singh Rajawat "Rani Sa" is the matriarch of the family and her adopted son Veer is a doctor. She also has a son named Vikram and a daughter named Nandini. Rani starts working for the Rajawats on Ramadheer's behalf and tries to prove her father's innocence. Nandini's fiancé, Jay Singh enters the palace and wants to marry Nandini only for money. He also has a bad eye on Rani and secretly lusts for her. Veer also has a fiancée named Kiara. Rani learns that Veer was the one who did the accident and forced Ramadheer to take the blame. Jay tries to rape her but she is saved by Veer and Jay is expelled from the palace. 

To avenge his humiliation, Jay plays a scheme due to which Rani is forced to marry Veer. The Rajawats don't accept Rani as their daughter-in-law, except Vikram. Veer's family continues to torture and insult Rani and Rani Sa also brings her sister, Padmini to expel Rani. However, Rani wins the heart of Padmini. Rani Sa brings back Jay and again fixes his marriage with Nandini. He starts an extramarital affair with Champa, a maidservant of the Rajawats. Veer and Rani expose Jay and he is again expelled from the palace. Rani Sa's husband, Digvijay and Nandini also accept Rani. Gradually Veer and Rani fall in love but Rani Sa keeps creating obstacles between them to keep them apart. 

Later Veer takes the blame of the accident and is arrested while Ramadheer is released. Later, it's revealed that Rani Sa was the one who did the accident and is arrested. Veer and Kiara marry in a drunken state. Kiara considers this marriage invalid while Vikram starts having feelings for her. Jay Singh kidnaps Rani. Rani is revealed to be in Goa. Veer, Vikram and Kiara go there and Veer saves her. Kiara loses her memory after being hit on her head by a goon while trying to save Veer. She forgets about Veer and Rani's marriage and starts considering herself as Veer's fiancée again and starts treating Rani like a servant. She regains her memory but fakes a memory loss to marry Veer.

Rani's childhood friend, Birju who loved her even before her marriage reaches Goa when he learns about the torture Rani is enduring. Soon, Kiara is exposed. Rani and Veer consummate their marriage Rani Sa is released from jail and makes Veer believe that Rani is having an affair with Birju. Veer expels Rani at night and tortures her further. Rani Sa is soon exposed and Veer and Rani reunite. Veer and Rani make Vikram and Kiara realise their love but Rani Sa refuses to accept Kiara. Jay wins Nandini and Rani Sa's heart and marries Nandini while Veer and Rani fail to expose him.  

Veer's biological father, Ranvijay returns and it's revealed that Veer is Rani Sa and Ranvijay's son and not an orphan. Rani Sa had married Ranvijay first but he ran away, leaving her pregnant with Veer, which she was unaware of. Later, she married Digvijay, Ranvijay's younger brother, while Digvijay brings Veer home, stating him an orphan as doctor had forbidden them to reveal anything related to Ranvijay as it can detoriate Rani Sa's health. Ranvijay tries to separate Veer and Rani and even tries to kill her but is exposed. 

Rani Sa's step-sister, Vijya takes over the property of the Rajawats and her son, Suraj falls in love with Rani. Rani manages to help the Rajawats to regain their lost property and has Vijya and Suraj arrested. Nandini has Jay arrested due to his abusive behaviour towards her. Vikram and Kiara confess their love and unite. Veer and Rani; Vikram and Kiara remarry and Rani Sa accepts both Rani and Kiara as her daughter-in-laws. Finally, Veer and Rani reunite.

Cast

Main
Anushka Sen/Megha Ray as Rani Singh Rajawat: Ramadheer's daughter; Pinku's sister; Veer's wife; Kajri's cousin; Raghuveer's niece; Preet's friend; Birju's best friend; Suraj's ex-fiancée (2020)/(2020-2021)
Fahmaan Khan as Dr. Veer Pratap Singh Rajawat: Rajeshwari and Ranvijay's son; Digvijay's nephew and adoptive son; Nandini and Vikram's cousin and half-brother; Rani's husband; Suraj's step-cousin; Vijya's step-nephew; Kiara's ex-fiancé (2020–2021)
Tannaz Irani as Rajeshwari "Rani Sa" Singh Rajawat: Matriarch of the Rajawat family; Digvijay's wife; Ranvijay's ex-wife; Veer, Nandini and Vikram's mother; Vijya's step-sister; Suraj's step-aunt (2020-2021)
 Vivana Singh replaced Irani as Rani Sa (2021)

Recurring
Pratish Vora as Ramadheer Singh: Former chief-servant at Rajawat Household; Suman's son; Rani and Pinku's father (2020-2021)
Vivan Singh Rajput as Suraj Singh Shekhawat: Vijya's son; Veer, Vikram and Nandini's step-cousin; Rani's one-sided lover and ex-fiancé; Rajeshwari and Digvijay's step-nephew; (2021)
Sehrish Ali as Nandini Singh Shekhawat (née Rajawat): Rajeshwari and Digvijay's daughter; Vikram's sister; Veer's cousin and half-sister; Suraj's step-cousin; Jay's wife; Vijya's step-niece; Ranvijay's niece; Kiara's friend (2020–2021)
Pulkit Bangia as Vikram Pratap Singh Rajawat: Rajeshwari and Digvijay's son; Nandini's brother; Veer's cousin and half-brother; Kiara's husband; Vijya's step-nephew; Ranvijay's nephew (2020–2021)
Samaksh Sudi as Jay Singh Shekhawat: Nandini's husband; Malini's son (2020-2021)
Yajuvendra Singh as Digvijay Singh Rajawat: Bhairavi's son; Ranvijay's brother; Rajeshwari's husband; Vikram and Nandini's father; Veer's uncle and adoptive father; Rani's adoptive father-in-law; Kiara and Jai's father-in-law; Vijya's step-brother-in-law (2020–2021)
Gargi Patel as Bhairavi Singh "Rajmata" Rajawat: Ranvijay and Digvijay's mother: Veer, Vikram and Nandini's grandmother; Rani, Kiara and Jai's grandmother-in-law; Rajeshwari's mother-in-law (2020–2021)
Preyal Shah as Kiara Vikram Singh Rajawat (née Suryavanshi): Dev and Chandana's daughter; Veer's ex-fiancée and half-sister-in-law; Vikram's wife; Digvijay and Rajeshwari's daughter-in-law; Rani's half-sister-in-law; Jai and Nandini's sister-in-law (2020–2021)
Raymon Kakkar as Padmini Singh Shekhawat: Rajeshwari's sister, Veer, Vikram and Nandini's maternal aunt; Nakul's wife (2020)
Hiten Meghrajani as Arun Grover: A cook (2020–2021)
Komal Sharma/Dolphin Dubey as Kumud Prajapati: Servant at Rajawat Household (2020–2021)
Karan Kaushal Sharma as Dev Suryavanshi: Kiara's father; Chandana's husband; Vikram's father-in-law (2020–2021)
Jigna Shastry as Chandana Suryavanshi: Kiara's mother; Dev's wife; Vikram's mother-in-law 
 Akshita Arora as Suman Singh: Ramadheer's mother; Rani and Pinku's grandmother; Veer's grand-mother-in-law (2020–2021)
 Smita Dongre as Shanti Bajpai: Servant at Rajawat household (2020–2021)
 Sangeeta Kapure as Vijya Singh Shekhawat: Rajeshwari's step-sister; Veer, Vikram and Nandini's step aunt; Rani and Kiara's step aunt-in-law; Suraj's mother (2021)
 Imran Khan as Ranvijay Singh Rajawat: Veer's biological father; Rani's biological father-in-law; Vikram and Nandini's uncle; Digvijay's elder brother; Rajeshwari's ex-husband and brother-in-law (2021)
 Neeraj Khetarpal as Raghuveer Singh: Kajri's father; Rani and Pinku's uncle; Veer's uncle-in-law
 Pratiksha Rai as Kajri Singh: Raghuveer's daughter; Rani and Pinku's cousin; Veer's sister-in-law; Vikram's one-sided-lover and friend
 Manisha Singh Chauhan as Preet: Rani's college friend
 Anjali Thakkar as Malini Singh Shekawat: Jai's mother
 Sangeeta Adhikary as Champa: Maidservant in the Rajawat household and Jai's extramarital affair
 Niklesh Rathore as Birju Bhayankar: Rani's childhood friend who loves her secretly from inside
 Ahmad Harhash as Rama Singh Raj (2020-2021)

Production
Initially, Anushka Sen was cast for the role of Rani. She left the series three weeks after the launch claiming health issues while the producers cited that she was unprofessional and threw tantrums on the set. Anushka was replaced by Megha Ray. Tannaz Irani tested positive for COVID-19 but resumed shooting after she recovered. Megha Ray had tested positive for COVID-19 and she is staying at home quarantining. She eventually tested negative and she continued working. Tannaz Irani was replaced by Vivana Singh as Rajeshwari Singh Rajawat. Irani says that "It was a random call; they told me that I was required to shoot every day, as my character is pivotal. They went on to add that they have thought it through and since I can’t travel to Goa, they are replacing me. I am shocked and confused". The show telecasted its last episode on 16 October 2021.

Soundtrack

Two music videos were released from the soundtrack. The first one was picturized on Anushka Sen, while second one contains different scenes from the drama featuring Megha Ray and Fahmaan Khan.

References

External links 
 Apna Time Bhi Aayega on ZEE5 
 

2020 Indian television series debuts
Hindi-language television shows
Indian drama television series
Indian television soap operas
Television shows set in Mumbai
Zee TV original programming
Television shows set in Delhi